Bettega is an Italian surname. Notable people with the surname include:

Alessandro Bettega (born 1987), Italian footballer, son of Roberto
Attilio Bettega (1953–1985), Italian rally driver
Laura Bettega (born 1968), Italian cross-country skier
Roberto Bettega (born 1950), Italian footballer

Italian-language surnames